Cochliomyces is a genus of fungi in the family Euceratomycetaceae.

References

External links
Index Fungorum

Laboulbeniomycetes